Rafael Palma y Velásquez (: October 24, 1874  May 24, 1939) was a Filipino politician, Rizalian, writer, educator and a famous Freemason. He was a senator from 1916 to 1921 and was the fourth president of the University of the Philippines.

Biography
Palma was born in Manila on October 24, 1874, to Don Hermógenes Palma, a clerk at the Intendencia Office, and Hilaria Velásquez. His younger brother was the soldier-poet José Palma, the author of the Spanish poem Filipinas, which is, along with its subsequent translations, used in the Philippine National Anthem.

In 1885, he began his studies at the Ateneo de Manila and graduated with a Bachelor of Arts degree. In 1892, he began his law studies at the University of Santo Tomas. While enrolled in the university, he was employed in the Office of the Bureau of Lands.

He was also a reporter in La Independencia, the first Filipino daily newspaper, founded and directed by Antonio Luna. When Luna died in 1899, Palma assumed the paper's editorship. Aside from La Independencia, he was also involved in other papers, writing for La Patria, among others; and co-founding, along with Sergio Osmeña and Jaime de Veyra, El Nuevo Día, the first daily newspaper in Cebu.

In 1901, he passed the bar examinations. That same year, he founded the newspaper El Renacimiento, which was first published on September 3. He married Carolina Ocampo in February 1902. He left the newspaper work in 1903 and practiced law while also teaching at the Escuela de Derecho.

He started politics when he became a member and secretary of the Association of Peace. In the 1907 Philippine Assembly elections, he ran and subsequently won as an assemblyman representing the province of Cavite. On July 6, 1908, Governor-General James A. Smith appointed him as a member of the second Philippine Commission, becoming the youngest member to serve up to 1916. In the 1916 Philippine Senate elections, he was elected as a senator, representing the 4th district.

In September 1916, he was appointed by Governor-General Francis B. Harrison, through Executive Order No. 64, as Secretary of the Interior and served until his resignation in July 1920. In July 1925, he was inaugurated as the fourth president of the University of the Philippines. He served as UP president up until 1933 when he resigned due to the Hare-Hawes-Cutting bill controversy wherein then-Senate president Manuel Quezon threatened to cut the university's appropriations due to Palma's championing of the law. He then again ran for senator but lost to Juan Sumulong. In 1934, Palma was elected to the 1934 Constitutional Convention.

In the later years of his life, Palma was appointed by President Quezon as chairman of the National Board of Education. He held that position until his death in Manila on May 24, 1939, at the age of 64.

Honors

Books 
The Pride of the Malay Race, the English translation by Justice Román Ozaeta of Palma's biography of Filipino national hero José Rizal.
The Woman and the Right to Vote
The New Mentality, 1929.

Places named after him 
 Barangay Rafael Palma Real Estate Property, Diffun, Quirino.
 The building presently occupied by the Department of Justice and first named as University Hall was also previously named Palma Hall. A historical marker on the life of Rafael Palma is located on its ground floor.
 Palma Hall, which houses the College of Social Sciences and Philosophy of the University of the Philippines–Diliman, was named after him.
 University of Bohol, a private school in Tagbilaran, Bohol, was named the Rafael Palma College in 1946 until it was given its present name.
 Palma Bridge, University of the Philippines Los Baños
 There are many other schools in the country that are named after Rafael Palma, such as Rafael Palma Elementary School in Pasay and Rafael Palma Elementary School along Zobel Roxas Street (under the jurisdiction of Manila but geographically located in Makati).

References

External links 
 
 http://www.glphils.org/kinship/palma.htm

1874 births
1939 deaths
Department of Education (Philippines)
Filipino educators
Filipino Freemasons
Filipino journalists
Filipino writers
Senators of the 5th Philippine Legislature
Senators of the 4th Philippine Legislature
Members of the House of Representatives of the Philippines from Cavite
People from Manila
University of the Philippines alumni
Presidents of universities and colleges in the Philippines
Members of the Philippine Commission
Filipino newspaper editors
Members of the Philippine Independent Church